Ignas Budrys  (1933, Grigaičiai – 1999) was a Lithuanian painter.

See also
List of Lithuanian painters

References
This article was initially translated from the Lithuanian Wikipedia.

1933 births
1999 deaths
People from Vilnius District Municipality
20th-century Lithuanian painters